Drehnow is a municipality in the district of Spree-Neiße, in Lower Lusatia, Brandenburg, Germany.

History
From 1815 to 1947, Drehnow was part of the Prussian Province of Brandenburg. From 1952 to 1990, it was part of the Bezirk Cottbus of East Germany.

Demography

References

Populated places in Spree-Neiße